Nei Meme, also known as Bernadette Meme Tong, is the former First Lady of Kiribati. She is married to Anote Tong, the former President of the Republic of Kiribati. They have seven children, among them Vincent Tong, elected MP in 2020.

See also 
Women in Kiribati

References 

Living people
First ladies of Kiribati
Year of birth missing (living people)